Aliya Rasheed is a female Pakistani Dhrupad singer. She has trained under the Gundecha Brothers.

Background
Aliya is a teacher in the musicology department of the National College of Arts in Lahore, Punjab. She also teaches music at the Sanjan Nagar School.

See also
Dhrupad

References

External links
 Aliya Rasheed performance in Lahore
Express Tribune Pakistan 
Indian Express India 
Times of India India .

Pakistani musicians
Living people
Pakistani classical singers
Pakistani women singers
Articles containing video clips
Year of birth missing (living people)